Annedal is a district of Gothenburg, Sweden, which falls with the borough of Linnéstaden. It is older traditional working class district. Much of the original housing was demolished in the late 1960s and early 1970s for the construction of modern housing estates.

The Annedal Church, established in 1910, is located there.

The first Landshövdingehus was built in Annedal.

IFK Göteborg are located in Annedal.

People from Annedal include:
Christina Lindberg
Bertil Envall
Arvid E. Gillstrom
Olle Åkerlund
Bengt Rasin

See also
Boroughs and districts of Gothenburg
Districts of Sweden

References

Gothenburg